The ANZ Championship was a men's professional golf tournament, co-sanctioned by the European Tour and the PGA Tour of Australasia, that was played in Australia between 2002 and 2004. The event had been played as a 72-hole stroke-play tournament on the Australasian tour from 1998 to 2001 as the ANZ Tour Championship.

Uniquely for both tours, it was played using a modified stableford scoring system, similar to the former PGA Tour event The International. This departure from the usual stroke play format, designed to encourage more attacking play, was not received with universal approval as the perception was that it would penalise the steadier players.

In the final event in 2004, Laura Davies became the first female golfer to compete on either the Australasian or European Tour, but failed to make an impact, missing the cut and finishing in next to last place on −13 points.

Venues
The event has been played at the following venues:

1998–2000: Royal Canberra Golf Club
2001: Concord Golf Club
2002: The Lakes Golf Club
2003: New South Wales Golf Club
2004: Horizons Golf Resort

Winners

Notes

References

External links
Coverage on the European Tour's official site

Former PGA Tour of Australasia events
Former European Tour events
Golf tournaments in Australia
Recurring sporting events established in 1998
Recurring sporting events disestablished in 2004
1998 establishments in Australia
2004 disestablishments in Australia